The 1981 NCAA Division III baseball tournament was played at the end of the 1981 NCAA Division III baseball season to determine the sixth national champion of college baseball at the NCAA Division III level. The tournament concluded with four teams competing at Pioneer Park in Marietta, Ohio, for the championship. Four regional tournaments were held to determine the participants in the World Series. Regional tournaments were contested in double-elimination format, with all four regions consisting of six teams, for a total of 24 teams participating in the tournament.

Bids
The 24 competing teams were:

Regionals

West Regional
Wisconsin-Oshkosh (4–0),
Elmhurst (2–2),
Otterbein (2–2),
Claremont-Mudd-Scripps (1–2),
St. Olaf (1–2),
Buena Vista (0–2)

South Regional
North Carolina Wesleyan (4–1),
Lynchburg (3–2),
Ramapo (2–2),
Upsala (2–2),
William Paterson (1–2),
Salisbury State (1–2)
Records as listed on Baseball Reference. Either William Paterson or Salisbury State would have to have been 0–2 instead of 1–2 and either Ramapo or Upsala would have to have been 1–2 instead of 2-2.

Mideast Regional
Ada, OH (Host: Ohio Northern University)

Marietta (5–1),
Alma (3–2),
York (PA) (2–2),
Wooster (1–2),
Monmouth (IL) (0–2),
Ohio Northern (0–2)

Northeast Regional
Willimantic, CT (Host: Eastern Connecticut State College)

Ithaca (5–1),
Eastern Connecticut State (3–2),
unknown (2–2),
Westfield State (1–2),
Queens (0–2),
SUNY Cortland (0–2)

World Series

Participants

Bracket
Pioneer Park-Marietta, OH (Host: Marietta College)

See also
1981 NCAA Division I baseball tournament
1981 NCAA Division II baseball tournament
1981 NAIA World Series

References

NCAA Division III Baseball Tournament
Tournament